Alexander Hubert Arthur Hogg (1908–1989) was a British archaeologist best known for his work on hillforts. His gazetteer British Hill Forts: an index was published in 1979.

Education
Hogg was educated at Highgate School in London and Sidney Sussex College, Cambridge.

Career
He began his professional career as a civil engineer. Throughout his career he maintained an interest in archaeology, coming to specialise in the construction and design of hillforts. In 1949 he became Secretary of the Royal Commission on the Ancient and Historical Monuments of Wales. He remained there until his retirement, developing the commission's approaches to archaeological survey and recording. He was Chair of the Gwynedd Archaeological Trust in 1982/83.

Hogg's monumental gazetteer British Hill Forts: an index (1979) was the first comprehensive list of hillforts in the British Isles.

Publications
 Hogg, A.H.A. 1979, British Hill-forts - an index. British Archaeological Reports (BAR British Series 62).
 Hogg, A.H. A. 1984, Guide to the Hill-forts of Britain. Paladin.

See also
 Atlas of Hillforts of Britain and Ireland

References

External links
 

1908 births
1989 deaths
English archaeologists
Prehistorians
Alumni of Sidney Sussex College, Cambridge
20th-century British engineers
People educated at Highgate School
20th-century English historians
English civil engineers
20th-century English male writers
English male non-fiction writers